Lindenwold is a borough in Camden County, in the U.S. state of New Jersey. As of the 2020 United States census, the borough's population was 21,641, an increase of 4,028 (+22.9%) from the 2010 census count of 17,613, which in turn reflected an increase of 199 (+1.1%) from the 17,414 counted in the 2000 census.

As of 2020, Lindenwold had the 10th-highest property tax rate in New Jersey with an equalized rate of 4.810% compared to 3.470% in the county as a whole and a statewide average of 2.279%. The borough is part of the South Jersey region of the state.

History
Lindenwold was created on April 23, 1929, from Clementon Township, one of seven municipalities created from the now-defunct township, and one of five new municipalities: Hi-Nella, Pine Hill, Pine Valley (since merged with Pine Hill), and Somerdale) created on that same date. The borough's first official meeting was held on the following May 31 in the old Fire Hall at Linden Avenue and Berlin Road. The name "Lindenwold" (German for "linden forest") was suggested by Wimer Bedford, a local resident who had been reading a German book that included the word. Bedford sought to have linden trees planted along the borough's streets, but local officials chose cheaper trees as an alternative.

Geography
According to the U.S. Census Bureau, the borough had a total area of 3.94 square miles (10.21 km2), including 3.90 square miles (10.11 km2) of land and 0.04 square miles (0.11 km2) of water (1.07%). Unincorporated communities, localities and place names located partially or completely within the township include Kirkwood and Lucastown.

Lindenwold borders the Camden County municipalities of Berlin Borough, Berlin Township, Clementon Borough, Gibbsboro, Gloucester Township, Laurel Springs, Pine Hill, Somerdale, Stratford, and Voorhees Township.

Demographics

2010 census

The Census Bureau's 2006–2010 American Community Survey showed that (in 2010 inflation-adjusted dollars) median household income was $47,462 (with a margin of error of +/− $2,694) and the median family income was $55,906 (+/− $3,257). Males had a median income of $34,580 (+/− $5,293) versus $35,523 (+/− $3,099) for females. The per capita income for the borough was $22,793 (+/− $1,111). About 9.8% of families and 11.1% of the population were below the poverty line, including 15.0% of those under age 18 and 4.4% of those age 65 or over.

2000 census
As of the 2000 census, there were 17,414 people, 7,465 households, and 4,299 families residing in the borough. The racial makeup of the borough was 61.42% White, 28.22% African American, 0.48% Native American, 3.53% Asian, 0.06% Pacific Islander, 3.24% from other races, and 3.06% from two or more races. Hispanic or Latino of any race were 7.56% of the population.

There were 7,465 households, out of which 29.1% had children under the age of 18 living with them, 35.0% were married couples living together, 16.6% had a female householder with no husband present, and 42.4% were non-families. 34.3% of all households were made up of individuals, and 7.0% had someone living alone who was 65 years of age or older. The average household size was 2.32 and the average family size was 3.00.

In the borough, the population was spread out, with 23.6% under the age of 18, 10.4% from 18 to 24, 36.2% from 25 to 44, 20.9% from 45 to 64, and 8.8% who were 65 years of age or older. The median age was 33 years. For every 100 females, there were 91.3 males. For every 100 females age 18 and over, there were 87.8 males.

The median income for a household in the borough was $36,080, and the median income for a family was $40,931. Males had a median income of $34,990 versus $26,514 for females. The per capita income for the borough was $18,659. About 11.3% of families and 11.8% of the population were below the poverty line, including 15.1% of those under age 18 and 5.1% of those age 65 or over.

Government

Local government
Lindenwold is governed under the Borough form of New Jersey municipal government, which is used in 218 municipalities (of the 564) statewide, making it the most common form of government in New Jersey. The governing body is comprised of the Mayor and the Borough Council, with all positions elected at-large on a partisan basis as part of the November general election. A Mayor is elected directly by the voters to a four-year term of office. The Borough Council has six members elected to serve three-year terms on a staggered basis, with two seats coming up for election each year in a three-year cycle. The Borough form of government used by Lindenwold is a "weak mayor / strong council" government in which council members act as the legislative body with the mayor presiding at meetings and voting only in the event of a tie. The mayor can veto ordinances subject to an override by a two-thirds majority vote of the council. The mayor makes committee and liaison assignments for council members, and most appointments are made by the mayor with the advice and consent of the council.

In the November 2021 general election, Walter F. Lenkowski was elected to fill the seat expiring in December 2022 that had been held by Joseph C. Strippoli until he resigned from office in July 2021.

, the Mayor of Lindenwold Borough is Democrat Richard E. Roach Jr., whose term of office ends December 31, 2023. Members of the Lindenwold Borough Council are Joseph DiDomenico (D, 2022), Linda M. Hess (D, 2023), Walter F. Lenkowski (D, 2022; elected to serve an unexpired term), Odessa Patton (2024), Cheryle Randolph-Sharpe (D, 2024), Sandra Sinon (D, 2023).

The borough of Lindenwold is serviced by Ambulnz (formally Jefferson Health) EMS 24/7. EMS is staffed with two NJ State Certified EMTs who operate as BLS 63 daily. EMS also covers the neighboring borough Clementon.

Federal, state, and county representation
Lindenwold is located in the 1st Congressional District and is part of New Jersey's 4th state legislative district.

Politics
As of March 2011, there were a total of 9,970 registered voters in Lindenwood, of which 4,510 (45.2%) were registered as Democrats, 714 (7.2%) were registered as Republicans and 4,742 (47.6%) were registered as Unaffiliated. There were 4 voters registered as Libertarians or Greens.

In the 2012 presidential election, Democrat Barack Obama received 80.2% of the vote (4,936 cast), ahead of Republican Mitt Romney with 18.7% (1,152 votes), and other candidates with 1.1% (67 votes), among the 6,206 ballots cast by the borough's 10,991 registered voters (51 ballots were spoiled), for a turnout of 56.5%. In the 2008 presidential election, Democrat Barack Obama received 76.4% of the vote (5,208 cast), ahead of Republican John McCain, who received around 20.5% (1,400 votes), with 6,813 ballots cast among the borough's 9,556 registered voters, for a turnout of 71.3%. In the 2004 presidential election, Democrat John Kerry received 71.1% of the vote (4,295 ballots cast), outpolling Republican George W. Bush, who received around 27.3% (1,650 votes), with 6,042 ballots cast among the borough's 9,306 registered voters, for a turnout percentage of 64.9.

In the 2013 gubernatorial election, Democrat Barbara Buono received 52.6% of the vote (1,406 cast), ahead of Republican Chris Christie with 45.7% (1,221 votes), and other candidates with 1.7% (46 votes), among the 2,744 ballots cast by the borough's 11,121 registered voters (71 ballots were spoiled), for a turnout of 24.7%. In the 2009 gubernatorial election, Democrat Jon Corzine received 61.8% of the vote (1,871 ballots cast), ahead of both Republican Chris Christie with 30.6% (927 votes) and Independent Chris Daggett with 4.5% (135 votes), with 3,027 ballots cast among the borough's 9,848 registered voters, yielding a 30.7% turnout.

Education
The Lindenwold Public Schools serve students in pre-kindergarten through twelfth grade. As of the 2018–19 school year, the district, comprised of five schools, had an enrollment of 2,845 students and 240.1 classroom teachers (on an FTE basis), for a student–teacher ratio of 11.8:1. Schools in the district (with 2018–19 enrollment data from the National Center for Education Statistics) are 
Lindenwold Preschool with 159 students in Pre-K, 
Lindenwold School 4 with 630 students in grades K–4, 
Lindenwold School 5 with 591 students in grades K–4, 
Lindenwold Middle School with 840 students in grades 5–8,  and Lindenwold High School with 543 students in grades 9–12.

At the end of the 2007–08 school year, the Roman Catholic Diocese of Camden closed Saint Lawrence Regional School and merged it together with schools in Somerdale and Stratford to create John Paul II Regional School.

Transportation

Roads and highways

U.S. Route 30 is the main highway serving Lindenwold.

Public transportation

The Lindenwold station is home to the eastern terminus and main operations facility for the PATCO Speedline. It is also a stop on NJ Transit's Atlantic City Line, which runs from 30th Street Station in Philadelphia to the Atlantic City Rail Terminal.

NJ Transit offers bus service between the borough and Camden on the 403 route, with local service on the 451 and 459 routes, and service to Atlantic City on the 554.

Notable people

People who were born in, residents of, or otherwise closely associated with Lindenwold include:
 Earl Harrison (born 1961), former professional basketball player
 Suzy Hotrod (born 1980), roller derby skater
 Carlton R. Rouh (1919–1977), Medal of Honor recipient
 Jimmy Woode (1926–2005), jazz bassist

References

External links

 Lindenwold Borough municipal website
 Lindenwold Public Schools
 
 School Data for the Lindenwold Public Schools, National Center for Education Statistics

 
1929 establishments in New Jersey
Borough form of New Jersey government
Boroughs in Camden County, New Jersey
Populated places established in 1929